Luís Miguel Pereira Cortez (born 18 April 1994) is a Portuguese footballer who plays for Ponte da Barca as a midfielder.

Football career
On 18 May 2013, Cortez made his professional debut with Sporting B in a 2012–13 Segunda Liga match against Penafiel replacing Tobias Figueiredo (79th minute).

References

External links
 
 Stats and profile at LPFP 

1994 births
Sportspeople from Setúbal
Living people
Portuguese footballers
Association football midfielders
Sporting CP B players
Liga Portugal 2 players
C.F. Os Belenenses players
S.C.U. Torreense players
Atlético Clube de Portugal players
Casa Pia A.C. players